The Syntrophobacterales are an order of Thermodesulfobacteriota. All genera are strictly anaerobic. Many of the family Syntrophobacteraceae are sulfate-reducing. Some species are motile by using one polar flagellum.

Phylogeny
The currently accepted taxonomy is based on the List of Prokaryotic names with Standing in Nomenclature (LPSN) and National Center for Biotechnology Information (NCBI)

See also 
 List of bacterial orders
 List of bacteria genera

References

External links
 Synthrophobacterales J.P. Euzéby: List of Prokaryotic names with Standing in Nomenclature

Thermodesulfobacteriota